Lena is a rural locality (a village) in Syultinsky Selsoviet, Ilishevsky District, Bashkortostan, Russia. The population was 25 as of 2010. There is 1 street.

Geography 
Lena is located 27 km southeast of Verkhneyarkeyevo (the district's administrative centre) by road. Tashchishma is the nearest rural locality.

References 

Rural localities in Ilishevsky District